Cephalota is a genus of beetles in the family Cicindelidae, containing the following species:

 Cephalota atrata (Pallas, 1776)
 Cephalota besseri (Dejean, 1826)
 Cephalota chiloleuca (Fischer von Waldheim, 1820)
 Cephalota circumdata (Dejean, 1822)
 Cephalota deserticola (Faldermann, 1836)
 Cephalota deserticoloides (Codina, 1931)
 Cephalota dulcinea Marco, De la Rosa & Baena, 2006
 Cephalota eiselti (Mandl, 1967)
 Cephalota elegans (Fischer von Waldheim, 1823)
 Cephalota galathea (Theime, 1881)
 Cephalota hispanica (Gory, 1833)
 Cephalota jakowlewi (Semenov, 1895)
 Cephalota kutshumi (Putchkov, 1993)
 Cephalota littorea (Forskal, 1775)
 Cephalota luctuosa (Dejean, 1831)
 Cephalota maura (Linnaeus, 1758)
 Cephalota schrenkii (Gebler, 1841)
 Cephalota tibialis (Dejean, 1822)
 Cephalota turcica (Schaum, 1859)
 Cephalota turcosinensis (Mandl, 1938)
 Cephalota vonderdeckeni Gebert, 1992
 Cephalota zarudniana (Tschitscherine, 1903)

References

Cicindelidae